Puebla del Príncipe is a municipality in Ciudad Real, Castile-La Mancha, Spain. It has a population of 1,019.

During the Roman period, the town was called Mariana.

Municipalities in the Province of Ciudad Real